{{DISPLAYTITLE:C16H13N}}
The molecular formula C16H13N (molar mass: 219.28 g/mol, exact mass: 219.1048 u) may refer to:

 Benzylisoquinoline
 N-Phenylnaphthalen-1-amine (NPN)

Molecular formulas